Morris Arthur "Morrie" Critchley (March 26, 1850 – March 6, 1910) was a 19th-century professional baseball pitcher.  He played one game for the Pittsburgh Alleghenys and four games for the St. Louis Brown Stockings in 1882.  He pitched five complete games in five games started and finished his career 1–4 with a 3.35 ERA.

Death
He died at age 59 from a heart disease in 1910.

References

External links 

1850 births
1910 deaths
Baseball players from Connecticut
Pittsburgh Alleghenys players
St. Louis Brown Stockings (AA) players
19th-century baseball players
Auburn (minor league baseball) players
Hornellsville Hornells players
Albany (minor league baseball) players
Baltimore (minor league baseball) players
Sportspeople from New London, Connecticut